Tourmobile was a sightseeing company that operated in Washington DC from 1969 until 2011. The company was founded as a subsidiary of Universal Studios with three buses and grew to become an independent company carrying more than 700,000 passengers per year at $32 per ticket on its fleet of 45 vehicles. Passengers were able to board and alight as often as they liked on the day in which a ticket was purchased. Tourmobile operated a legal monopoly for guided tours of the National Mall and Arlington National Cemetery, which prevented the DC Circulator, Capital Bikeshare, WMATA, and other organizations from providing services in highly-traveled parts of the city. This monopoly was highly controversial from the start. The National Park Service received an estimated $330,000 per year from the arrangement. After the termination of the Tourmobile contract, companies including Gray Line Worldwide and Open Top Sightseeing began providing National Mall tours. The company's fleet consisted of a distinctive style of bus, the newest of which was manufactured in 1976.

References

Companies based in Washington, D.C.
Travel and holiday companies of the United States
National Mall
National Mall and Memorial Parks
Conservation and restoration of vehicles
Transportation companies based in Washington, D.C.